Amanda Queffélec-Maruani (born 18 April 1978), known professionally as Amanda Sthers, is a French  novelist, playwright, screenwriter and filmmaker.

Biography
Sthers is of Tunisian Sefardi and Breton origins. She has written ten novels which have been translated in more than 14 countries.

Her first play, "Le Vieux Juif blonde" is today studied at Harvard University. Her play "Le Lien" has been performed in Paris and at the Avignon Festival in 2013, and was widely performed in Italy in 2016.

Sthers wrote and directed the movie Je vais te manquer in which she directed Carole Bouquet, Michael Lonsdale, and Mélanie Thierry.

In 2015, she wrote an adaptation of Les Terres Saintes / Holy Lands, which she later directed in English. Shooting took place during winter 2017 in Israel.

At the 2017 Zurich Film Festival, Madame, a feature film that she wrote and directed in English was screened, starring Toni Collette, Harvey Keitel, and Rossy de Palma.

Personal life

Singer and actor Patrick Bruel was Sthers' first husband with whom she married 21 September 2004. The two have two children, Oscar and Léon who was born 28 September 2005. The couple separated in 2007.

Sthers moved to Los Angeles with her two children in 2017 where she started a film production company.

Awards and honours
 Sthers has been given the title of "Chevalier des Arts et des Lettres" by the French government.

Works 
 2002: Caméra Café, TV series, writer
 2004: Ma place sur la photo, novel
 2005: Chicken Street, novel
 2006: Le vieux juif blonde, play with Mélanie Thierry, directed by Jacques Weber
 2006: Le chat bleu, l’alouette et le canard timide, children book, drawings by Pierre Cornuel, Grasset Jeunesse
 2007: Thalasso, play
 2007: Madeleine, novel
 2007: Les pt'its legumes, children book
 2008: Keith Me, novel, Stock
 2010: Les terres saintes, novel, Stock
 2010: Liberace, biography, Plon
 2011: Le carnet secret de Lili Lampion, children book, stage musical at the Théâtre de Paris
 2012: Rompre le charme, novel, Stock
 2012: Le lien, play
 2013: Dans mes yeux, Johnny Hallyday biography, Plon
 2013: Les érections américaines, essay, Flammarion
 2013: Mur, play
 2015: Les promesses, novel, Grasset
 2015: Conseil de famille, play, Théâtre de la Renaissance
 2017: Madame, feature film, writer and director
 2017: Holy Lands, feature film, writer and director
 2021: Promises, feature film, writer and director
 2022: Le café suspendu, novel, Grasset
 2023: Mafia Mamma, feature film, original story idea

References

External links 

 

1978 births
Living people
Writers from Paris
French women novelists
French women screenwriters
French screenwriters
French women dramatists and playwrights
French women film directors
French people of Tunisian-Jewish descent
Film directors from Paris
21st-century French novelists
21st-century French dramatists and playwrights
21st-century French women writers
Chevaliers of the Ordre des Arts et des Lettres
21st-century French screenwriters